This is a list of films featuring unemployment.

Fictional Films featuring unemployment 

 The Big Lebowski
 Gates of Paris
 The Grapes of Wrath
 Heat
 Idiot Box
 It's a Free World...
 Master of the World
 Mondays in the Sun
 New Kids Turbo
 The Pursuit of Happyness
 Raining Stones
 Time Out
 Two Days, One Night
 Washington Merry-Go-Round

See also 
 Unemployment

Unemployment
Films
Unemployment